6 km may refer to:

6 km in Cross country running
6 km (village)